Tanaa Banaa is a Pakistani Ramadan special romantic teen drama television series Created and developed by Shahzad Javed, Head of Content, HUM TV, directed by Saife Hassan, written by Hassaan Imam and produced by Momina Duraid under her banner MD Productions. It features Alizeh Shah and  Singer Ali Zafar's Brother, debutant Danyal Zafar in lead roles while Komal Rizvi, Javeria Abbasi, Aamir Qureshi, Hassan Noman and Ismat Zaidi in supporting cast. The serial aired everyday in Ramadan 2021 on Hum TV and the final episode was aired on 1st Day of Eid.

Plot summary 

The story revolves around the life of a newly married young couple Zain and Zoya. Zoya Saleem Qamar has just graduated and wants to pursue her master's degree. She presents her conditions for marriage in written form and Zain signs them without reading them. Zain believes in love after marriage and engaged to Zoya. After their engagement, the story takes a new turn and they realized the responsibilities of their relationship .

Cast 

 Alizeh Shah as Zoya Saleem Qamar, Zain's wife
 Danyal Zafar as Zain, Zoya's husband 
 Ismat Zaidi as Qamar-un-Nisa
 Javeria Abbasi as Fauzia, Zain's mother 
 Komal Rizvi as Zaib-un-Nisa, Zain's phuppo (father's sister)
 Aamir Qureshi as Furqan, Zain's father
 Hassan Noman as Shahid, Zaib-un-Nisa's husband
 Yashraj Vaswani as Bilal aka Billu, Zain's cousin
 Sarah Nadeem as Zoya's mother
 Tania Amna Hussain as Ayesha Saleem Qamar, Zoya's Sister
 Ilma jaffery as Iqra, Zoya's college friend

Soundtrack

References

External links 
 

Pakistani drama television series
2021 Pakistani television series debuts